In dynamical systems, a spectral submanifold (SSM) is the unique smoothest invariant manifold serving as the nonlinear extension of a spectral subspace of a linear dynamical system under the addition of nonlinearities. SSM theory provides conditions for when invariant properties of eigenspaces of a linear dynamical system can be extended to a nonlinear system, and therefore motivates the use of SSMs in nonlinear dimensionality reduction.

Definition
Consider a nonlinear ordinary differential equation of the form

with constant matrix  and the nonlinearities contained in the smooth function .

Then, the eigenspace  is an invariant subspace of the linearized system

Under addition of the nonlinearity  to the linear system,  generally perturbs into infinitely many invariant manifolds. Among these invariant manifolds, the unique smoothest one is referred to as the spectral submanifold.

Existence
In particular, there can be no linear combination of  equal to one of the eigenvalues of  outside of the spectral subspace. If there is such an outer resonance, one can include the resonant mode into  and extend the analysis to a higher-dimensional SSM pertaining to the extended spectral subspace.

Non-autonomous extension
The theory on spectral submanifolds extends to nonlinear non-autonomous systems of the form

with  a quasiperiodic forcing term.

Significance
Spectral submanifolds are useful for rigorous nonlinear dimensionality reduction in dynamical systems. The reduction of a high-dimensional phase space to a lower-dimensional manifold can lead to major simplifications by allowing for an accurate description of the system's main asymptotic behaviour. For a known dynamical system, SSMs can be computed analytically by solving the invariance equations, and reduced models on SSMs may be employed for prediction of the response to forcing.

Furthermore these manifolds may also be extracted directly from trajectory data of a dynamical system with the use of machine learning algorithms.

See also
Invariant manifold
Nonlinear dimensionality reduction
Lagrangian coherent structure

References

External links
Tool for automated SSM computation

Dynamical systems